James R. Ramsey (born November 14, 1948) is the former president of the University of Louisville, located in Louisville, Kentucky, and the former president of the closely related University of Louisville Foundation. On August 1, 2002, he became the school's acting president and on November 4, 2002, he was named its permanent president. On June 17, 2016, Kentucky Governor Matt Bevin announced that Ramsey would be stepping down as president and that the entire board of trustees of the university would be immediately disbanded and replaced. This was confirmed in a statement issued by Ramsey on the same day. Ramsey offered his resignation at a Board of Trustees meeting on July 27, 2016, which was accepted by the board. He will remain as head of the University of Louisville Foundation.

Background 
Ramsey earned a Bachelor of Science degree in Business Administration from Western Kentucky University in 1970, and a Master of Arts and Ph.D. in Economics from the University of Kentucky in 1972 and 1974, respectively.  He also served in the United States Army Reserve from 1970 to 1977.

Ramsey served twice as Kentucky's budget director under Democratic Governor Paul Patton from 1995–1998 and again from 1999–2002 and worked as the state government's chief economist. He has also directed Kentucky's Office of Financial Management, been the state's chief Economic Analyst, and worked in the Office of Investment and Debt Management. He also worked as interim commissioner of Kentucky's Office of the New Economy.

Ramsey was an economics professor at five other universities: the University of North Carolina at Chapel Hill, Loyola University, the University of Kentucky, Western Kentucky University, and Middle Tennessee State University.

Work as president of the University of Louisville 
Since Ramsey became president, his administration's main goals have been to continue the school's large gains in research activity and endowment, and to improve infrastructure and aesthetics of the university's Belknap campus. At the suggestion of his wife, Jane, a $1 million campus beautification project was begun, which planted hundreds of trees on the roads around the campus and painted five overpasses with a UofL theme. In addition, he has worked with city and state officials to modify the nearby I-65 area to provide better access to campus, improve Stansbury Park, and redevelop vacant industrial buildings near campus into upscale housing or athletic facilities.

Major academic accomplishments completed since Ramsey took office include an increase of over $200 million in the schools endowment, the doubling of federal research funding, an increase of two points in the school's average ACT scores among new students, improvements in retention, and an increasing enrollment from areas outside the Louisville area. Major physical projects include the completion of a new nanotechnology research building, an expansion of the Ekstrom Library, three new student residence halls, new natatorium, lacrosse field, Indoor Football practice facility, and baseball stadium and adjacent sports medicine complex. Work is ongoing for a new heart disease research building and a state of the art medical laboratory on the school's medical campus.

The last several years of Ramsey's tenure as president of the university were marked with "numerous scandals", including an escort sex scandal involving basketball playing recruits between 2010 and 2014 that led to a postseason playing ban for the 2015–16 season, a gaffe involving him and his staff dressing up as stereotypical Mexicans for a Halloween party, and his holding dual roles as both president of the university and president of the university's charitable foundation.

Costume controversy 
In October 2015, Ramsey and his wife hosted a Halloween luncheon at the university presidents' mansion, at which he and his staff dressed in costumes as stereotypical Mexicans, wearing sombreros and large fake mustaches. They posed for a group photo holding maracas, with Ramsey wearing a colorful striped poncho. Ramsey and his Chief of Staff later apologized after this was criticized as being culturally insensitive.

Fund mismanagement controversy 
Ramsey is accused of mismanaging over $55M in University Foundation funds. He was sued by the institution. The suit says the defendants knowingly caused the foundation to spend endowment funds at an excessive rate and that they took endowment money that should have been invested and diverted it to speculative ventures, loans, and gifts that had little realistic chance of repayment. In July 2021, the university who had previously sought $80 million in damages from Ramsey, settled for only $800,000.

It also alleges that "while engaged in this disloyal conduct, Ramsey and Smith paid themselves (and others) excessive compensation out of the foundation."

The university outside counsel, Andrew Campbell, managing partner of the Birmingham, Ala., firm Campbell Guin, said the evidence "clearly establishes a pattern of mismanagement in appropriated  expenditures and unauthorized acts...mainly through the direction and planning of" Ramsey and Smith."

Dual role as president of the University of Louisville Foundation 
Ramsey received criticism for holding the position of president of the University of Louisville while also being the president of the University of Louisville Foundation, a $1.1 billion fund-raising entity associated with the university. He received $2.8 million in compensation from the Foundation in 2014. The relationship between the university and the foundation has been under investigation by the Kentucky State Auditor Mike Harmon.

References

External links 

 Official University of Louisville biography

Living people
Presidents of the University of Louisville
Middle Tennessee State University faculty
University of North Carolina at Chapel Hill faculty
University of Kentucky faculty
Western Kentucky University faculty
1948 births
United States Army soldiers
Fern Creek High School alumni